Epipremnum ceramense is a plant species of family Araceae. This type of woody vine is endemic in Maluku Islands' rainforest.

Name
The specific name ceramense was taken from the plant's locality Seram Island, which was formerly called Ceram Island.

References

ceramense
Endemic flora of the Maluku Islands